The A-List is a reality television series featuring countdowns of the wildest creatures of the animal kingdom. Every episode classifies animals into categories for which they are known best. It was shown on Animal Planet from 2007–2008.

Episodes

Episode 1: Oddities
 Albino alligator
 Two-faced kitten
 Cojioned Nile tilapia twin
 Italy's unicorn
 Elbowed squid
 White lion
 Two-headed turtle
 Yoda the four-eared feline
 Giant rabbit
 Henry the Hexapus

Episode 2: Green
 Ball python
 Woodpecker
 Fennec fox
 Grey parrot
 Lemur
 Great white shark
 Earthworm
 Vulture
 Dung beetle
 Bee

Reception
Common Sense Media rated the show 3 out of 5 stars.

References

External links

Animal Planet original programming
2007 American television series debuts
2008 American television series endings